Philadelphia-Montgomery Christian Academy, commonly known as Phil-Mont Christian Academy, is a selective private Christian school serving grades PK-12. Phil-Mont was founded in 1943 by Cornelius Van Til and others. Phil-Mont's curriculum is rooted in a christian worldview, the principles of the liberal arts, and uses some features of a classical education model. Phil-Mont currently resides in the former Springfield Township High School & Hillcrest Junior High School building, built in 1923/24. Phil-Mont purchased the unused building and restored it to working order for grades 6-12 in 1979. The property was originally part of Chestnut Hill Park/White City Amusement Park, part of which is now also Springfield Township's James A. Cisco Park and Hillcrest Pond.

Athletics 

Over half of the student body participates on a team each year and several of the school's alumni return to serve their alma mater as coaches. Starting back in the 1960s, Phil-Mont was a member of the Keystone Scholastic Athletic Conference. This was a close-knit league made up of smaller-sized private schools within the surrounding counties. During their tenure within the KSAC, Phil-Mont won championships in boys' soccer, cross country, basketball, baseball, and tennis. Girls' championships were achieved in field hockey, tennis, basketball, and softball.

In 2007, Phil-Mont became a Class A member of the PIAA District One and joined the Bicentennial Athletic League. This new league, comprising both private and public schools, provides strong local competition along with the opportunity for teams as well as individuals to advance into District, Regional, and State Championships.

League and District Championships Since 2007

Soccer (B) '07 -'08, '08 -'09, '09 -'10, '10 -'11

X-Country (B) '07 -'08, '08 -'09

Basketball (B) '10 -'11, '13 -'14, '15 -'16

Basketball (G) '13 -'14, '14 -'15, '15 -'16

Fine Arts

Art 

Art class at Phil-Mont runs from Kindergarten through 12th grade, and includes AP Advanced Placement Art.

Drama 

Phil-Mont hosts 3 stage performances a year, including a Fall Musical*, Winter Play**, and a Spring Fine Arts Festival*.

*Middle and High School combined

**High School only

Music 

Music is taught at Phil-Mont at the elementary, middle, and high school levels. 

*Core Instruments: Clarinet, Flute, French Horn, Saxophone, Trumpet, Trombone, Percussion

**Other Instruments: Baritone Horn, Tuba, Saxophone

History 
In 1939, Dr. Cornelius Van Til gave a series of lectures at Calvary Pres. in Willow Grove, regarding the responsibility of Christian parents to train their children apart from the state schools. He was instrumental in leading a small group of families to start the Christian School Society of Willow Grove.

In September 1943, the first classes of the Willow Grove Christian Day School began with 1 teacher and 17 students in three elementary classes. The school met in the basement of Calvary Presbyterian Church in Willow Grove. The school grew to K–8 by 1955.

In 1956 the Philadelphia-Montgomery Christian High School began with 3 teachers and 34 ninth and tenth graders. The students met at the First Reformed Church of Germantown until the newly acquired Wyncote Elementary building was fixed up in preparation for grades 9–12.

In 1964–65, the elementary and high schools merged, becoming Philadelphia-Montgomery Christian Academy.
In 1969 a new school facility, to house grades K–12, was built on a 20-acre site in nearby Dresher. 
In 1979 the former Hillcrest Junior High School was purchased to house the middle and high schools (6–12).
In 2006–07, the elementary, middle, and high schools merged on the Hillcrest campus.

Press 
In 2012, Philadelphia Magazine included Phil-Mont Christian Academy in their list, "Guide to (45) Great Private Schools" which ranks "the region’s best performers."

In 2021, nich.com ranked Phil-Mont #22 (out of 343) of Pennsylvania's most diverse private high schools, ranked Phil-Mont #14 (out of 82) of Pennsylvania's best Christian high schools, and ranked Phil-Mont #29 (out of 98) of Pennsylvania's best private K-12 schools

Notable alumni 
 Christian Smith - American Sociologist, and the William R. Kenan, Jr. Professor of Sociology and Director of the Center for the Study of Religion and Society at the University of Notre Dame.
 Lawrence E. Lockman - Representative (R) for District 137 in Maine's House of Representatives.
 Charles R. Gerow - Prominent American strategic communications professional, and CEO of Quantum Communications, a Harrisburg-based public relations and public affairs firm.

Notes

References

External links 

 

Christian schools in Pennsylvania
Schools in Philadelphia
1943 establishments in Pennsylvania
Educational institutions established in 1943